Line of Sight (French: La ligne de mire) is a 1960 French drama film directed by Jean-Daniel Pollet and starring Pierre Assier, Michèle Mercier and Édith Scob.

Cast
 Pierre Assier as Pedro  
 Michèle Mercier as Hélène  
 Édith Scob as Pascale  
 Remy Jussan as Bernard  
 Joël Holmès as Marc 
 Michel Gonzalès as Henri  
 Pierre Jourdan as M. Gordo  
 Charles Millot as The leader of the gang  
 Véra Belmont as Pedro's friend  
 Hugues Wanner as The hunter 
 Claude Melki and Yves Barsacq as The weirds castle men
 Georges Mazauric
 André Philip 
 Henri Poirier

References

Bibliography 
 Maurice Bessy & Raymond Chirat. Histoire du cinéma français: 1956–1960. Pygmalion, 1990.

External links 
 

1960 drama films
French drama films
1960 films
1960s French-language films
1960s French films